Ochrimnus barberi is a species of seed bug in the family Lygaeidae. It is found in Central America and North America.

References

Further reading

 

Lygaeidae
Articles created by Qbugbot
Insects described in 1964